Jack Herndon "Buddy" Brewer  (April 21, 1918 – November 30, 2003) was a pitcher in Major League Baseball who played from 1944 through 1946 for the New York Giants. He attended the University of Southern California.

In a three-season career, Brewer posted a 9–10 record with 73 strikeouts and a 4.36 ERA in 43 appearances, including 28 starts, 10 complete games, and 216 innings of work.

External links

1918 births
2003 deaths
Baseball players from Los Angeles
Clinton Giants players
Jersey City Giants players
Knoxville Smokies players
Major League Baseball pitchers
Minneapolis Millers (baseball) players
New York Giants (NL) players
Sacramento Solons players
San Francisco Seals (baseball) players
Tri-City Braves players
USC Trojans baseball players